The Black Holes and Revelations Tour was a worldwide concert tour by English alternative rock band Muse in support of their fourth studio album Black Holes and Revelations. Lasting at over 2 years, this was the band's longest tour to date.

Overview
In July 2006 the band announced that they would be going on their "biggest ever tour" in support of the album.

The tour opened with a slot at Radio 1's Big Weekend in Dundee, Scotland, Muse's first concert since the Live 8 concerts in July 2005. During the summer of 2006 the band played their first series of shows, including a headline appearance at the Leeds and Reading Carling Weekend festivals. Following that was a tour that visited most of the world's major continents. The tour saw them travelling over most of the world, including countries such as the UK, most of Europe, the US, Canada, Australia, Japan, China and Korea. This tour also included the band's maiden visits to South-East Asian countries such as Malaysia and Indonesia, and Latin and South America.

The band's shows throughout the Black Holes and Revelations Tour became noted for their increasing usage of special effects. For their Carling Weekend shows the band used a display with neon tubes that had 10 smaller video screens in front, with 5 on the ground and 5 moving behind them. Smaller versions were used for other concerts on the 2006 European Festival circuit, plus on the first two US legs, the first Australian tour and the band's South-East Asian tour.

For the band's main European autumn/winter arena tour, Muse were originally intending to use the same set but changed their set design to a design based upon the H.A.A.R.P. installation in Alaska. The new design included a pod-style drum-riser over the top of drummer Dom Howard's drum kit on stage right while above the stage a pair of pylons carrying light-up tubes occupied the roof space and a giant video screen occupied the back wall. Originally the band wished for the pylon to extend into the audience but lack of money meant this wasn't possible. This show was modified for the 2007 European festival circuit with the drum-riser and kit moved into centre-stage and a new video screen above the riser, with 4 video 'strips' on stage with 2 either side of the drums. The riser was removed from this production at the end of the European festival shows.

Between the European arena and festival/stadium tours, the band embarked on a tour to Australia and the Far East. The band were 2nd on the bill at the 2007 Big Day Out Festival, behind headliners Tool. The band also played sideshows in Sydney and Melbourne before embarking on concerts in South East Asia, Muse's debut concerts. The South East Asia tour led to the band's biggest tour of Japan and a debut Muse show in South Korea. The band then moved to America, playing their biggest North American headline concerts at the time at the Inglewood Forum and the Palacio de los Deportes arena in Mexico City.

The biggest concert of the tour was the two nights that they played in the new Wembley Stadium on 16 and 17 June 2007. They were the first band to play at and sell out the newly rebuilt stadium. The show incorporated much more extensive special effects than other concerts, which included huge satellite dishes, "futuristic" antennas, giant white balls and thousands of lights. The encore featured two acrobats that floated high above the crowd suspended on floating white balloons during the performance of "Blackout", an album track from previous record Absolution. Footage of the latter concert was released on DVD whilst a live CD album contained a selection of recorded tracks from the two nights. Both discs were released as a joint package under the title HAARP.

After Wembley the tour continued with Muse playing many gigs on the European festival circuits including headline appearances at Rock Werchter and the Benicàssim Festival. The tour then progressed to Muse's biggest North American tour at that point, including appearances at New York City's Madison Square Garden, Morrison's Red Rocks Amphitheatre and a headline appearance at Lollapalooza 2007.

Following that the band then did a tour of Eastern Europe in October before heading for an arena tour of Australia in November, finally ending 2007 at the KROQ Almost Acoustic Christmas. The following year saw Muse have a much more relaxed schedule, but still saw Muse make play their first ever gigs in Dubai and South Africa at festivals, before making their gig debuts in South America on a 3-week arena tour.

In April 2008, the band also played a show for the Teenage Cancer Trust at London's Royal Albert Hall, which saw the band perform a much more stripped down show than usual but was also said by the band to be one of their favourite gigs of the tour. The band also performed "Megalomania", the final song from 2nd album Origin of Symmetry, for the first time since 2002, with Matt Bellamy playing the Albert Hall's famous organ.

The tour finished on 17 August 2008 when the band performed a headline slot at the Stafford leg of the British V Festival. For this show plus V's sister show in Chelmsford and a show a few days earlier at Marlay Park in Dublin, the band converted their Wembley satellite dishes into multiple video screens and also used a huge extensive light show.

Personnel
Matthew Bellamy – lead vocals, guitar, piano
Christopher Wolstenholme – bass, backing vocals, harmonica, guitar on "Hoodoo"
Dominic Howard – drums, backing vocals on "Supermassive Black Hole"
Morgan Nicholls – keyboards, synthesizers, backing vocals, percussion, bass on "Hoodoo"

Tour dates

Festivals and other miscellaneous performances

Support shows
Muse performed slots for Depeche Mode in Sweden and My Chemical Romance in the United States. Muse were also due to support My Chemical Romance for another seven dates in the United States, however due to the illness of both bands as they had been struck down with food poisoning, these gigs were canceled. 

Below is a list of songs played on the Black Holes and Revelations tour:

References

Muse (band) concert tours
Black Holes and Revelations Tour, The
Black Holes and Revelations Tour, The
Black Holes and Revelations Tour, The